Frank Theodore Gnup (April 5, 1917 – September 27, 1976) was an American quarterback, halfback and coach who played Canadian football from 1946 to 1952.

A native of Aliquippa, Pennsylvania who was a star player at Manhattan College, Gnup took the Ontario Rugby Football Union by storm in 1946 as a player-coach, leading his Hamilton Wildcats to the league championship game, was named an all-star, and won the Imperial Oil Trophy as ORFU most valuable player. He played in Hamilton for 3 more seasons, but had a falling out, and played the 1950 season with the Toronto Argonauts (6 regular season games.) He finished his playing days in 1952 with the Brantford Redskins of the ORFU.

After his playing days Gnup took up coaching in 1955 with the UBC Thunderbirds. His 18 years at the University of British Columbia are legendary, and in 1999 he was enshrined in the UBC Sports Hall of Fame. He has since been honoured by having the AAA Provincial Championships and the CWUAA Frank Gnup Memorial Trophy as Player of the Year named after him. The ever cigar chomping Gnup died of a heart attack September 27, 1976, aged 59.

References

1917 births
1976 deaths
Hamilton Wildcats football players
Manhattan Jaspers football players
Third Air Force Gremlins football players
Toronto Argonauts players
Ontario Rugby Football Union players
People from Aliquippa, Pennsylvania
Players of American football from Pennsylvania
American expatriates in Canada